Nitin Goel (born 6 April 1969) is an Indian cricketer. He played in 68 first-class matches for Haryana from 1986/87 to 1998/99. His father was Rajinder Goel, who also played first-class cricket for Haryana.

References

External links
 

1969 births
Living people
Indian cricketers
Haryana cricketers
Cricketers from Delhi